Knoebels Amusement Resort is a family-owned and operated amusement park, picnic grove, and campground in Elysburg, Pennsylvania. Opened in 1926, it is America's largest free-admission park. The park has more than 60 rides including three wooden roller coasters, three steel roller coasters, a 1913 carousel, and a haunted house dark ride.

The amusement park is owned and operated by the Knoebel (pronounced kuh-NO-bel) family, who also operate a lumber yard next to the park. The park's name has traditionally been spelled "Knoebels" without the apostrophe, and appears that way on all official park advertising and correspondence.

The park straddles the line between Northumberland and Columbia Counties. The complex is mainly in the Columbia County townships of Cleveland and Franklin and is in Ralpho Township on the Northumberland County side of the South Branch Roaring Creek.

The park and its rides have won awards from organizations such as Amusement Today, American Coaster Enthusiasts, and the International Association of Amusement Parks and Attractions. In 2014, Travel Channel rated Knoebels one of their Top 10 Family Friendly Amusement Parks in the United States.

History 

Knoebels is located in a small wooded valley in central Pennsylvania. The valley, originally known as "Peggy's Farm", with its creek-fed swimming hole, was a popular picnic destination in the early 20th century, attracting Sunday travelers and horse-drawn hayride wagons. Henry Knoebel, who farmed in the area, tended the horses and later sold soft drinks, ice cream, and snacks to the visitors. As the popularity of "Knoebels Grove" grew, Knoebel leased plots of land along the creeks for use as summer cottage sites. Some of these privately owned cottages, as well as cottages Knoebel built and rented, still exist in the park today.

In 1926, Knoebel added a restaurant, a steam-powered Philadelphia Toboggan Company carousel, and a few simple games to his grove, marking the beginning of Knoebels Amusement Park. On July 4, 1926, he opened a large concrete swimming pool on the site of the old swimming hole. Featuring a filtration system that provided clean water instead of muddy creek water, the pool was named "The Crystal Pool". Since then, the park has developed around the pool, adding 50 rides, assorted games, concession stands, and other attractions. A campground with six sites opened behind the amusement park in 1962, and as of 2004, the campground covered  with 500 sites.

On June 22, 1972, the creeks that run through Knoebels, swollen with heavy rains from Hurricane Agnes, rose  over their banks. The flood destroyed six cottages and damaged many other buildings, including 24 of 25 rides and the park's roller rink. The roller rink building was re-floored and used as a skating rink until the mid-1980s, when it was converted into the "Roaring Creek Saloon", which now contains a concession stand, an arcade, the XD Theater, and performances. A new building constructed after the flood became the Haunted Mansion, where the Haunted Mansion dark ride opened in 1973. The ride has been recognized as one of America's best dark rides by organizations,such as Dark Ride, Funhouse Enthusiasts and the National Amusement Park Historical Association.

The park again suffered major flooding in 1975, 1996, 2004, 2006, and 2011. Each caused substantial damage, but the 1975 and 1996 floods occurred during the off-season. Although the January 1996 flood left substantial damage, the worst occurred after the waters receded, when everything froze, making cleanup and repair throughout the amusement park difficult. The September 2004 flood, caused by the remnants of Hurricane Ivan, was only a half-day affair and Knoebels staff had the amusement park partially reopened by mid-afternoon.

On June 28, 2006, a flood second only to the Agnes flood struck Knoebels. About 90 percent of the amusement park was under water just prior to the July 4th weekend. As the waters began to recede, Knoebels staff was able to reopen over 60 percent of its attractions within two days and 90 percent within four days. Because over 100 tons of mud had to be dug out of the Crystal Pool, it required 10 days to be operational. The last ride to return to operation was the Kiddie Panther Cars, whose repairs took almost three weeks.

In 2008, the park’s dark ride was the subject of a one-hour documentary, "Laff In The Dark’s Behind The Scenes At Knoebel’s Haunted House".

On September 7, 2011, Knoebels experienced its most recent flood, caused by Tropical Storm Lee. Water levels neared those of the flood of 1972 and damages exceeded that flood. The majority of the park reopened the following weekend, having missed only two days of operation.

In 2015 a new roller coaster opened, named the "Impulse", that replaced two former rides, the bumper boats and boat tag, both of which had been losing popularity, while maintenance costs became increasingly high.

In 2016, Knoebels celebrated its 90th anniversary and opened The Nickle Plate Bar and Grill at Knoebels Three Ponds Golf Club.

On July 23, 2018, Knoebels was flooded when a creek overflowed and flooded the park. About 150 employees were at the park cleaning up. The park then flooded again on July 25, 2018. The park reopened on July 27, 2018.

Admissions 

The park offers free admission, free parking, and free entertainment. Visitors are able to ride the park's attractions by purchasing either pay-one-price, all-day/unlimited-access wristbands (which are not usually available on weekends, except near the beginning and end of each season), limited-access hand stamps or books of tickets, with hand stamp costs varying depending on the height of the rider. Knoebels has several hand stamp options, such as "Sundown Plan" and "Bargain Nights", when the park offers discounts on regular ride passes. Knoebels all-day passes do not include the Haunted Mansion or the Crystal Pool, which are additional fees. The "Scenic Skyway", Black Diamond, and the Flying Turns were also an additional fee when opened, but they have since been included in most pay-one-price plans.

Rides and attractions

Roller coasters 
Knoebels has six operating roller coasters. Knoebels' two main wooden roller coasters are well known, with Phoenix consistently rated in the top ten lists and Twister ranking high as well.

Carousels 

Knoebels has two carousels: one small merry-go-round in Kiddieland (added in 1976) which was built by Stein & Goldstein in 1910; and the Grand Carousel, a 1913 carousel built by Kremer's Carousel Works in Long Island City, with a frame by Charles I. D. Looff, (1852–1918), and 63 hand-carved horses by Charles Carmel (1869–1931). It was purchased on January 26, 1942, from Riverside Park in Piscataway Township, New Jersey, for $4,000 (equal to $ today) and relocated to Knoebels. Today, the Knoebels Grand Carousel is one of the largest carousels in the world, with 63 horses and 3 chariots. It is one of the few carousels remaining with a working ring dispenser, allowing riders on the outside row of horses to reach out and grab steel rings as they pass. The rider who grabs the brass ring receives the cost of the ride in tickets, making the ride free. Three band or fairground organs provide music for the riders. The largest, "the Frati," was built in Germany in 1888 by Frati & Co. Berlin, and was converted to artisan roles in the 1920s. The smaller, outside organ is "the Berni," a 1910 Gebruder Bruder, style 107, sold in the US by the August Berni Organ Company in New York. The Frati and Berni have operated at Knoebels since its purchase in 1942. The smallest one is a Wilhem Bruder organ, model 79, converted to a Wurlitzer 125 duplex roll system, and restored in 1996. The Grand Carousel has always been voted the best carousel in the Golden Ticket Awards competition held by Amusement Today since 2007. The carousel competition was retired in 2019, because the Grand Carousel had been undefeated. Today, the Grand Carousel is the second-oldest ride in the park. The S&G Carousel is the oldest at 108 years old in the 2018 season.

Trains 
The park operates two separate miniature railways

Other rides and attractions 

In addition to a  Ferris wheel (Known as the Giant Wheel), a  log flume, and a  Chute-the-Chutes ride named "Sklooosh!" (after the sound wet sneakers make), Haunted Mansion( a 3-minute dark ride that is consistently rated as one of the best traditional haunted houses) and one of the last remaining Fascination parlors in the United States, the park maintains more than 63 rides, including:

Knoebels will refurbish and open a Bayern Kurve for 2023.

Former rides
1001 Nacht, Huss/Weber 1001 Nights
Axis, Zamperla Mixer
Boat Tag
Bumper Boats
Eli Ferris Wheel
Flying Cages
Fire Ball
Frog Hopper
German Carousel
Hey Dey, a combination of whip and tilt-a-whirl, removed by 1930
High Speed Thrill Coaster, Overland kiddie coaster
Jet Star, Schwarzkopf portable Jet Star roller coaster
Kiddie Carousel, Allan Herschell aluminum ponies, replaced by the S&G Carousel
Kiddie Cars, Allan Herschell aluminum casts
Kiddie Planes
Kiddie Wheel, possibly destroyed in 1972 flood
Lindy Loop
Merry-go-round, Gallagher model replaced by the Grand Carousel, sold to Toby Park and destroyed in hurricane
Moon Rocker
Spindle
Space Ship, raised up and converted into Sky Slide
Strat-O-Ship
Over The Top, SBF/Visa. Operated for only a few weeks in the 2018 season before being removed due to countless complications. 
Wipeout, which resembles the old ride Trabant. Removed following the 2020 season.
Whip, an 8-car model replaced by the 12-car Whipper
Whirlwind, Vekoma portable Whirlwind roller coaster

Restaurants and food 
Knoebels has restaurants throughout the park, both sit-down and counter service in nature. These eateries have contributed toward the park winning awards from organizations which judge amusement park food, including Amusement Today's Golden Ticket Award for Best Food every year since 2000, until Dollywood narrowly edged Knoebels in 2012, and both parks tied for first place in 2013. Knoebels reclaimed the prize in 2015 and 2016. It lost again to Dollywood in 2017, but snatched the prize back in 2018.

The primary sit-down restaurant at the park is the Alamo. Counter service restaurants include Cesari's Pizza, Oasis Cafeteria, Phoenix Junction Steakhouse and the International Food Court. Food ranges from "Famous Fresh Cut French Fries", pierogi (a mashed potato filled East European dumpling) and potato cakes to Bison Burgers and Gator Bites to milkshakes and homemade fudge.  The park also features novelty items like the pickle on a stick, caramel apple chips, and cheese on a stick.

The park's Cesari's Pizza and the International Food Court were featured on a Food Network special. The alligator bites served at the International Food Court were selected by Delish.com as one of the top seven daring amusement park foods.

The Nickle Plate Bar & Grill is a casual dining restaurant at Three Ponds Golf Course

Three Ponds Golf Course 
Knoebels Three Ponds Golf Course is located on Pennsylvania Route 487 roughly a quarter mile from the park and campground. It is a par 71 eighteen-hole golf course which provides two very different nine-hole layouts. The front nine holes are located on the side of the mountain which provides the golfer with numerous elevation changes from tee to green. The back nine holes are located in the valley. The back nine landscape is less dramatic but still offers numerous challenges such as water and various risk-reward approach shots. The prices for the course vary from $23 to $40, with reduced rates for 9-hole games. The park also offers discounted golf passes to guests at the Knoebels campsite.

Accident history 
In 1999, an attorney representing two girls who sustained injuries while riding the Speed Slide discovered 15 injuries had been reported to the Pennsylvania Department of Agriculture's Bureau of Ride and Measurement Standards in recent years, including six other reports of injuries to riders' genital areas. Both girls underwent emergency surgery. The park was charged with negligence, failure to monitor the amount of force of the water and its effect on riders, failure to fix defects, and failure to provide adequate warnings to riders. Both of the plaintiffs fully recovered.

See also 

 Incidents at independent amusement parks

Further reading 
 Futrell, Jim. Amusement Parks of Pennsylvania. Mechanicsburg, Pennsylvania: Stackpole Books, 2002.
 Deitz, Harry J. Knoebels: An Amusement Park with a Heart. Reading, Pennsylvania: Westlawn Graphic, 2001. (Now out of print)

References

External links 
 Knoebels Amusement Resort official site
 Park history
 

Amusement parks in Pennsylvania
1926 establishments in Pennsylvania
Tourist attractions in Northumberland County, Pennsylvania
Tourist attractions in Columbia County, Pennsylvania
Buildings and structures in Northumberland County, Pennsylvania
Buildings and structures in Columbia County, Pennsylvania
Family-owned companies of the United States